The 1993–94 Alabama–Huntsville Chargers men's ice hockey team represented the University of Alabama in Huntsville in the 1993–94 NCAA Division II men's hockey season.  The Chargers were led by Doug Ross, who was in his 12th season as head coach, and played their home games at the Von Braun Civic Center.

The Chargers finished the regular season with a 19–4–1 record, including a win over Division I Providence.  As the top-ranked team in Division II, UAH hosted the Division II Championship Series against Bemidji State.  UAH won the first game of the series 5–3, behind two goals from Junior Garry Symons.  Bemidji State won game 2, 2–1, setting up a 20-minute "mini-game" tiebreaker.  Tied at 1 after 20 minutes, Bemidji scored 15:48 into overtime to win the championship.  The final was attended by 6,451 at the VBCC, a record for a Division II event.

Roster
Source:

|}

Schedule and results
  Green background indicates win.
  Red background indicates loss.
  Yellow background indicates tie.

|-
!colspan=12 style=""| Regular Season

|-
!colspan=12 style=""| NCAA Championship Series

Statistics
Source

Skaters

Goaltenders

References

Alabama–Huntsville Chargers men's ice hockey seasons
Alabama Huntsville
Alabama Huntsville
Alabama Huntsville